The Najaden class, also known as the Huitfeldt class, was a class of two torpedo boats built for and operated by the Royal Danish Navy. Construction started in 1942, with the ships being completed in 1947, and continuing in service until 1966.

Construction and design
In 1939, Denmark ordered two torpedo boats (originally to be named Aarhus and Aalborg) for the Royal Danish Navy.

Construction was delayed by the German invasion of Denmark in 1940, with the ships not being laid down until 3 July 1942. They were launched in 1943, but when Germany dissolved the Danish government on 29 August 1943, it did not attempt to complete the half-built ships. Work restarted following the liberation of Denmark, and the two ships were completed in 1947.

As completed, they had an armament of two 105 mm M/40 guns, with three Bofors 40 mm and six Madsen 20 mm anti-aircraft guns. Torpedo armament was six 450 mm torpedo tubes, which had been originally fitted to the Dragen- and Glenten-class torpedo boats, which were disarmed in 1941 when taken over by Germany. They were powered by geared steam turbines, giving  and driving two shafts.

Service
When they entered service, they were designated torpedo boats, but were re-designated Coastal Destroyers (Kystjager) in 1951 and Patrol Boats in 1958. The 450 mm torpedo tubes were replaced by 530 mm tubes in 1951, and the 20 mm cannon removed in 1961. Both ships were sold for scrap on 27 May 1966.

Ships

Footnotes

References

 
 
 
 
 
 
 

Torpedo boats of the Royal Danish Navy
Torpedo boat classes